Muneville may refer to the following places in the Manche départment, France:

Muneville-le-Bingard
Muneville-sur-Mer